The 2015 Formula Renault 1.6 Nordic season was the third season of the Formula Renault 1.6 Nordic, a series running 1600cc Formula Renault machinery in similar fashion to the French F4 Championship, and the last one to run under the backing of Renault. The series began on 9 May at Skövde Airport and ended on 26 September at Ring Knutstorp, after fifteen races held in seven venues. Most of these rounds were held in support of the 2015 Scandinavian Touring Car Championship season, joint organiser of the series along with the FIA Northern European Zone Organisation.

The series uses all-carbon Signatech chassis, 1.6-litre 140bhp Renault K4MRS engines, and Michelin tyres.

Drivers and teams

Race calendar and results
Except for the third round, which was held in Finland, all races took place in Sweden. All Swedish rounds, with the exception of the one at the Kinnekulle Ring, were held in support of the STCC championship.

Rounds denoted with a blue background were a part of the Formula Renault 1.6 NEZ Championship.

Championship standings
Points system
Points were awarded to the top 10 classified finishers. Starting from this season, an extra point was awarded for pole position and fastest lap for each race.

Parallel to the main championship, two other championships were held: the Formula Renault 1.6 Junior Svenskt Mästerskap (JSM) for drivers under 26 years old holding a Swedish driver license, and the Formula Renault 1.6 Northern European Zone (NEZ) championship at selected rounds. Points to these championships were awarded using the same system, with the sole exception of pole position and fastest lap not awarding points.

Formula Renault 1.6 Nordic Championship

Formula Renault 1.6 JSM Championship

Formula Renault 1.6 NEZ Championship

References

External links
 Official website of the category at Renault Sport Sverige 
 Official website of the category at STCC

Nordic
Formula Renault
Renault 1.6 Nordic
Motorsport competitions in Sweden